Daniel Dillon may refer to:

 Daniel Dillon (footballer) (born 1986), English footballer
 Daniel Dillon (basketball) (born 1986), Australian basketball player